John Nicholas Cordts (August 17, 1867 – July 2, 1913) was an American politician from New York.

Life
John N. Cordts was born in Kingston, New York, the son of John H. Cordts. He attended the public schools, and then engaged with his father in the manufacture of brick.

On June 21, 1893, he married Matilda Loretta Stock, and later engaged with his brother-in-law in the sale of furniture.

He was a presidential elector in 1900, voting for William McKinley and Theodore Roosevelt.

Cordts was a member of the New York State Senate from 1905 to 1910, sitting in the 128th, 129th (both 25th D.), 130th, 131st (both 26th D.), 132nd and 133rd New York State Legislatures (both 27th D.).

He died at his home in Kingston on July 2, 1913.

References

Sources
 Official New York from Cleveland to Hughes by Charles Elliott Fitch (Hurd Publishing Co., New York and Buffalo, 1911, Vol. IV; pg. 366)
 "Weddings Yesterday; Cordts — Stock" in NYT on June 22, 1893
 "Ulster and Greene May Go Democratic" in NYT on October 26, 1910

1867 births
1913 deaths
Republican Party New York (state) state senators
Politicians from Kingston, New York
1900 United States presidential electors
19th-century American politicians